Esa Mujer is the first hits album by Mexican pop singer Verónica Castro, It was released in 1984. The album had one new song, "Esa Mujer", which was the song to Castro's telenovela Yolanda Luján in 1984. It was the last album she recorded for Peerless Records.

Track listing
 "YO QUISIERA SEÑOR LOCUTOR" (Fabiola Del Carmen)
 "MI PEQUEÑO CICLON" (Manolo Marroqui) 
 "SOY CELOSA" (Fabiola Del Carmen)
 "EL DESCOLON" (Manolo Marroqui)
 "PALABRAS DE AMOR" ( Memo Mendez Guiu)
 "ADIOS" (Juan Gabriel)
 "ESA MUJER" ( Memo Mendez Guiu) 
 "HASTA QUE TE PERDI" (Roberto Belester)
 "TU ME PROMETISTE VOLVER"  (Joaquín Galán) 
 "APRENDI A LLORAR" (Lolita de la Colina)
 "UNA AVENTURA (Juan Gabriel)

Singles

1984 compilation albums
Verónica Castro albums